Roberts Lapainis (October 17, 1913 – October 30, 1947) was a Latvian ice hockey goaltender. He played with the Latvia men's national ice hockey team at the 1936 Winter Olympics held in Garmisch-Partenkirchen, Germany.

References

External links

 Latvian Olympic Committee profile

1913 births
1947 deaths
People from Aizkraukle Municipality
People from Courland Governorate
Ice hockey players at the 1936 Winter Olympics
Latvian ice hockey goaltenders
Olympic ice hockey players of Latvia
Soviet ice hockey players